The 2020–21 SDHL season was the 14th season of the Swedish Women's Hockey League (SDHL). The season began on 12 September 2020 and concluded on 26 February 2021. All ten teams were able to complete a full 36-game regular season. The season marked the return to play for the SDHL after the 2019–20 season championship finals were cancelled due to the COVID-19 pandemic in Sweden.

League business

Background 
Both Modo Hockey and Göteborg HC survived relegation in the 2019–20 SDHL season, having respectively defeated the Skellefteå AIK and the Malmö Redhawks of the Damettan. HV71 had finished at the top of the league table during the 2019–20 regular season, and were due to face-off against Luleå HF/MSSK in the playoff championships before the season was cancelled due to the COVID-19 pandemic.

Partnerships 
During the 2020 summer off-season, the league announced the extension of the sponsorship with DHL, the league's main sponsor. In October 2020, the league launches an online merchandise store in collaboration with DHL. Spendrups brewery Norrlands Guld extended their sponsorship rights over the SDHL Goal of the Week, voted for by the public. In August, the league announced an expansion of its partnership with the men's Swedish Hockey League (SHL) through 2024, with an increase in investment of several million kronor.

Collective bargaining 
In September, the Swedish ice hockey players' association, SICO, announced the league's first-ever collective bargaining agreement between the players, the league, and the Swedish national team, providing injury insurance for both league and international games along with aid for education and job-finding post-retirement. The agreement came into effect on 1 October 2020.

Media rights 
C More Entertainment acquired the broadcasting rights for the season's games, with 20 regular season games and 10 playoff games (including the championship finals) to be broadcast live by the national broadcaster Sveriges Television (SVT). The C More broadcasting team included former Olympic silver medal winner Pernilla Winberg, along with former NHLer Staffan Kronwall, and journalist Kajsa Kalméus.

COVID-19 impact 
The COVID-19 pandemic in Sweden had a significant impact on league operations. The country's approach is guided by the Public Health Agency of Sweden, although the health boards of every individual region have a degree of autonomy in being able to impose additional regional measures, which many began doing in late October and early November as the second wave of the pandemic worsened.

Before the start of the season, along with the men's SHL and HockeyAllsvenskan, the SDHL presented a plan to allow a limited audience for games. The league will implement personalised tickets as well as blocking off rows of seats to ensuring physical distancing, and fan associations will not be allowed to organise trips to away games. Several clubs, including HV71 and Djurgården, opted to keep matches closed to the public, whether others opted to go ahead and sellup to 50 tickets. The Swedish Ice Hockey Association further set guidelines that a minimum of five players should be suspected of infection with COVID-19 before a match can be suspended. 

In October, the Swedish government announced plans to allow up to 500 spectators to attend sporting events, but soon backed down from the plan due to increasing case numbers in the country. Later that month, the SDHL announced a partnership with Dynamic Code to improve testing for players and personnel.

On the 15 November, a match between Linköping HC and Djurgårdens IF was cancelled after two Djurgården players tested positive for COVID-19 and a further two players showed symptoms. It marked the first confirmed cases in the league for the season. On 16 November, the Swedish government announced new pandemic restrictions, limiting the number of people allowed at public events to eight. On 17 November, Luleå HF announced that they would close their arena to the public beginning on 22 December. On 20 November, the Swedish government announced a 195 million kronor financial support package for ice hockey in Sweden, of which 3,1 million kr was assigned to the SDHL.

Because of the closedown of communal sports halls in Sweden, December-January, it was decided to not crown champions in Damettan whereupon the relegation tournament was cancelled, and no SDHL teams faced the risk of relegation.

Impact on player salaries 
Because the average SDHL salary is 5,500kr per month (compared to 121,000kr for the SHL), many SDHL players have second jobs outside of hockey and have been affected by cutbacks in the COVID-19 recession.

After the 2020 IIHF Women's World Championship was cancelled due to the COVID-19 pandemic, several Finnish national team players had to seek a second job since they did not receive the usual stipend for playing in the World Championships.

Format 
Each team plays 36 games, with three points being awarded for winning in regulation time, two points for winning in overtime or shootout, one point for losing in overtime or shootout, and zero points for losing in regulation time. At the end of the regular season, the team that finishes with the most points is crowned the regular season champion, and the top eight teams proceed to a playoff tournament. The two bottom-ranked teams proceed to a relegation tournament against the top two teams from the Damettan. The top two teams from the tournament qualify for the SDHL and the bottom two teams play in the Damettan in the next season, meaning that it is possible for one or both of the SDHL teams to be relegated and one or both of the Damettan teams to be promoted. This relegation tournament was cancelled due to COVID-19 restrictions.

Teams

Significant events

Pre-season 
 SDE Hockey goaltender Sofia Reideborn leaves the league after making a controversial podcatst 
 Luleå HF/MSSK all-time scorer Michelle Karvinen leaves the league to sign in Switzerland 
 Former NHLer and Sveriges Radio commentator Per Svartvadet suggests that the SDHL could limit the number of foreign players per team

Regular season

September 2020 
Linköping HC beat AIK 3–2 in the first match of the season; Luleå HF/MSSK beat HV71 4–0 in first rematch of the cancelled 2019-20 playoff finals; Modo Hockey forward Marion Allemoz scores first hat-trick of the season in 5–1 victory against Göteborg HC; SDE Hockey goaltender Lindsey Post posts 52-save shutout against Djurgårdens IF; newly appointed Swedish Ice Hockey Association general-secretary Johan Stark called for the men's and women's national teams to receive equal conditions; Brynäs IF forward Anna Meixner earns the Goal of Week award
 HV71 forward Danielle Stone posts 5-point game against Göteborg HC; the first collective bargaining agreement between the players and the league is announced; SDE forward Kayleigh Hamers earns the Goal of the Week award
 Brynäs IF defeats Luleå 7–4 to become the sole remaining undefeated team on the season; 19-year old Göteborg goaltender Frida Axell posts 51 save game as Göteborg earn their first point of the season; Ulf Lundberg is announced as new head coach of the Swedish national team

October 2020 
 The Swedish government announces its intention to relax COVID-19 restrictions, allowing up to 500 spectators for sporting events starting from the 15th of October, but ultimately cancels the relaxations due to a rise in cases
 Göteborg head coach Stefanie McKeough is forced to leave the club and return to Canada due to visa issues; the SDHL launches its webshop
 Emma Nordin is awarded the prize of Assist of the Month for September;
Linköping pauses club activities after 24 people connected the men's team test positive for COVID-19

November 2020 
A brawl erupted in the last minutes of a Modo victory over Leksands, with a total of 176 penalty minutes being assessed, including 5 fighting majors;
Several Finnish national team players are forced to miss several games while being quarantined under Finnish law after a player tested positive at a national team camp; 
the SDHL announces plans to make it so that at least one out of every four players can be able to play full-time within five years; 
HV71 goaltender Anna Amholt speaks out publicly about being hospitalized again with long covid
The Swedish government announces a pandemic financial support package for hockey leagues in Sweden

December 2020 
Lara Stalder picks up seven points in an 8-2 Brynäs victory over SDE
Jaycee Magwood scores in overtime to lead Modo to victory and completing a three-goal comeback from 4-1 down against Brynäs
The day after Christmas, Göteborg pick up their first win of the season, beating Leksands 3-1

January 2021 
AIK captain Sabina Küller is suspended for four matches following a headshot against Luleå forward Emma Nordin
After having retired at the end of the previous season, former Swedish national team captain Emilia Ramboldt makes a comeback with Linköping
A 13 January match between Modo and SDE is cancelled due to a massive snowstorm in northern Sweden

Regular season

Standings

Statistics

Scoring leaders
The following players lead the league in points at the conclusion of the regular season on 26 February 2021.

Leading goaltenders 

The following goaltenders led the league in save percentage at the conclusion of the regular season on 26 February 2021, while starting at least one third of matches.

Playoffs
The 2021 SDHL playoff schedule was announced on 18 February 2021 and featured quarterfinals during 1–4 March, semifinals during 7–12 March, and finals beginning on 15 March and concluding with the Swedish Championship title awarded no later than 1 April. Due to the impact of COVID-19 and the need to curb spread of infection, the order of games in each series was changed to limit the amount of travel for each series. The best-of-three quarterfinals were played A-H-H, with the home advantage (i.e. greater number of home games) granted to the higher seeded team. The best-of-five semifinals and finals were played A-A-H-H-H, with highest rank granted the advantage.

Bracket

Quarterfinals

Semifinals

Finals
The SDHL Playoff Finals for the Swedish Championship were postponed on 13 March, after a Brynäs player treated positive for COVID-19. Play resumed on 25 March with Brynäs hosting Luleå at Monitor ERP Arena in Gävle. 

Game 1: Brynäs took the lead early with an unassisted goal scored by Jalyn Elmes 4:46 into the first period. Luleå evened the score less than a minute later when Emma Nordin netted a goal with assists from Michela Cava and Jenni Hiirikoski. Luleå went on to score five unanswered goals and won the game 6–1. Both Hiirikoski and Cava notched three points in the game, each registering one goal and two assists.

Player awards

SDHL goal of the week

Week 37, 2020 – Anna Meixner, Brynäs
Week 38, 2020 – Kayleigh Hamers, SDE
Week 39, 2020 – Rosa Lindstedt, Brynäs
Week 40, 2020 – Emma Murén, Brynäs
Week 41, 2020 – Lara Stalder, Brynäs
Week 42, 2020 – Ingrid Morset, Linköping
Week 43, 2020 – Anna Meixner, Brynäs
Week 44, 2020 – Michela Cava, Luleå/MSSK
Week 46, 2020 – Michelle Löwenhielm, HV71
Week 47, 2020 – Lene Tendenes, Linköping
Week 48, 2020 – Emmy Alasalmi, AIK
Week 49, 2020 – Nicoline Jensen, Luleå/MSSK

Week 50, 2020 – Michela Cava, Luleå/MSSK
Week 53, 2020 – Carly Bullock, Linköping
 Week 1, 2021 – Kennedy Marchment, HV71
 Week 2, 2021 – Emmy Alasalmi, AIK
 Week 3, 2021 – Shae Demale, Leksand
 Week 4, 2021 – Sanni Hakala, HV71
 Week 5, 2021 – Linnea Johansson, Linköping
 Week 6, 2021 – Erica Udén Johansson, AIK
 Week 7, 2021 – Alice Östensson, Djurgården
 Week 8, 2021 – Sofia Engström, Modo
 Week 9, 2021 – Michela Cava,  Luleå/MSSK
 Week 10, 2021: Noora Tulus, Luleå/MSSK

See also 
 Women's ice hockey in Sweden
 Damettan

References

External links 
 League website 
 Official season statistics from the Swedish Ice Hockey Association

SDHL season
SDHL season
SDHL season
Women's ice hockey competitions in Sweden
SDHL season
SDHL season
Swedish Women's Hockey League seasons